Sam George Edwards (May 26, 1915 – July 28, 2004) was an American actor. His most famous role on television was as banker Bill Anderson on Little House on the Prairie.

Biography

Early years
Born into a show business family, his first role was as a baby in his mother's arms. He appeared on radio in the 1930s in the Adventures of Sonny and Buddy one of the first radio serials ever syndicated, and later in The Edwards Family, a series based on the life of Sam, brother Jack, who was also an actor, sister Florida, and his parents, Edna Park and Jack Edwards Sr. Sam was also an early cast member of one of the first radio soap operas, One Man's Family.

Military service
During World War II, Sam was inducted into the Army and ended up serving as part of the morale-building entertainment corps, spending much of the time in the African, European, and India/Burma theater, travelling for a time with Dwight D. Eisenhower and George S. Patton's regiments. He enlisted August 6, 1942 and was discharged November 15, 1945 as a "Buck" Sergeant.

Later years
Edwards spent much of his retirement travelling the world with his wife of 35 years, Beverly, and attending many Old Time Radio conventions where he participated in recreations of original shows from the 1940s and 1950s, as well as newer scripts. He spent his last 24 years based in Durango, Colorado where he died.

Death
On July 28, 2004, Edwards died of a heart attack in Durango, Colorado. He was survived by his wife, Beverly Motley Edwards, stepchildren William, Deborah and Linda Edwards, and several grandchildren.

Career

Radio
Edwards worked on a variety of radio programs. He co-starred in the comedy The First Hundred Years on ABC in 1949 and landed a starring role playing Dexter Franklin opposite Janet Waldo in the long-running Meet Corliss Archer series. He also had recurring or cast member roles in radio on Crime Classics, Dr. Paul; Father Knows Best, Guiding Light, Fort Laramie; Gunsmoke; Dragnet; Suspense; Escape; This Is Your FBI; The Six Shooter; and Yours Truly, Johnny Dollar.

Film
Edwards' first major screen role was as Chuck Ramsey in the movie serial version of Captain Midnight (1942). From 1949 to 1981, he made several film appearances, with significant roles in Twelve O'Clock High (1949), Operation Pacific (1951), Gangbusters (1954), and supporting roles in The Beatniks (1960) and Suppose They Gave A War and Nobody Came (1969). He was also seen in The Absent-Minded Professor (1961), Hello, Dolly! (1969) and The Postman Always Rings Twice (1981).

Edwards was also often heard behind animated characters both on film and records. In 1942, he voiced the adult Thumper in the animated classic Bambi. Later work for Disney was largely on LP Records, including the voices of the Cowardly Lion and Tin Woodman on their Oz series, and as Tigger, Owl, and the Heffalumps on the Winnie the Pooh records. He voiced the title character of Rod Rocket in an early 1960s educational series, and did some episodes of the cult classic Jonny Quest. His last work for Disney was as Ollie Owl opposite singer Burl Ives as Sam the Eagle on their long-running America Sings attraction at Disneyland. There were numerous TV and radio commercials as well, both in front of and behind the camera.

Television
Edwards appeared on many television series starting in the mid-1950s. Most notable of these include many episodes of Dragnet and Gunsmoke throughout their long runs. He also appeared on over 60 different series, including The George Burns and Gracie Allen Show, Straightaway, The Andy Griffith Show, Petticoat Junction, Green Acres, Mannix, Mission: Impossible, The Streets of San Francisco, Adam-12, The Red Skelton Show, Happy Days, The Dukes of Hazzard, and even Days of Our Lives.  In 1969 Edwards appeared as Will Frazee on the TV series The Virginian in the episode titled "A Woman of Stone."

Selected filmography

High Hat (1937) – Performer
East Side Kids (1940) – Pete
Captain Midnight (1942) – Chuck Ramsey
Rubber Racketeers (1942) – Freddy Dale
Bambi (1942) – Adult Thumper (voice)
The Street with No Name (1948) – Whitey (uncredited)
Larceny (1948) – YAA President (uncredited)
The Countess of Monte Cristo (1948) – Bellhop (uncredited)
Twelve O'Clock High (1949) – Lt. Birdwell
The Sun Sets at Dawn (1950) – Herald Reporter
The Jackpot (1950) – Parking Lot Attendant (uncredited)
Flying Leathernecks (1951) – Junior (uncredited)
Operation Pacific (1951) – Junior
Witness to Murder (1954) – Tommy – Counterman (uncredited)
The McConnell Story (1955) – Radio Man (uncredited)
Between Heaven and Hell (1956) – Soames (uncredited)
The Badlanders (1958) – Crazy Convict (uncredited)
Torpedo Run (1958) – Coleman – Sub Radio Operator (uncredited)
Revolt in the Big House (1958) – Al Carey
The Beatniks (1960) – Red
The Absent Minded Professor (1961) – Military Radio Dispatcher (uncredited)
The Prize (1963) – Reporter (uncredited)
Three Guns for Texas (1968) – Sammy (uncredited)
The Young Runaways (1968) – Bert – Service Station Owner (uncredited)
Bullitt (1968) – (voice)
Dragnet 1966 (1969, TV Series) – Rodman (uncredited)
Hello, Dolly! (1969) – Laborer (uncredited)
The Cheyenne Social Club (1970) – Barfly Getting Up from Table (uncredited)
Suppose They Gave a War and Nobody Came? (1970) – Deputy Sam
Scandalous John (1971) – Deputy Sam 
The Deadly Dream (1971, TV Movie) – Man protesting his innocence (uncredited)
In Broad Daylight (1971, TV Movie) – Cunningham
The Death of Me Yet (1971, TV Movie) – Jerry
The Biscuit Eater (1972) – Gun Club Member (uncredited)
Set This Town on Fire (1973, TV Movie) – Motel Manager
Chase (1973, TV Movie)
Hog Wild (Walt Disney's Wonderful World of Color) (1974, TV Movie) – Farmer
Hit Lady (1974, TV Movie) – Innkeeper
Hurricane (1974, TV Movie) – Del Travis
Requiem for a Nun (1975, TV Movie) – Governor
Escape to Witch Mountain (1975) – Mate
The Flight of the Grey Wolf (1976, TV Movie) – Amsel
The New Daughters of Joshua Cabe (1976, TV Movie)
Viva Knievel! (1977) – Stadium Manager (uncredited)
Incredible Rocky Mountain Race (1977, TV Movie) – Milford Petrie
Just Me and You (1978, TV Movie) 
Mark Twain: Beneath the Laughter (1979, TV Movie) – Bixby
The Postman Always Rings Twice (1981) – Ticket Clerk

References

External links

A detailed biography from his stepson's website

1915 births
2004 deaths
American male radio actors
American male voice actors
American male television actors
American male film actors
Actors from Macon, Georgia
Male actors from Georgia (U.S. state)
United States Army non-commissioned officers
United States Army personnel of World War II
20th-century American male actors